Tillandsia secunda is a species of flowering plant in the genus Tillandsia. This species is native to Ecuador.

Cultivars
 Tillandsia 'El Primo'

References

BSI Cultivar Registry Retrieved 11 October 2009

secunda
Flora of Ecuador